Thérèse Desqueyroux may refer to:

Thérèse Desqueyroux (novel), 1927 French novel by François Mauriac
Thérèse Desqueyroux (1962 film), French adaptation of Mauriac's novel
Thérèse Desqueyroux (2012 film), French adaptation of Mauriac's novel

See also
 Therese (disambiguation)